The Sluch or Northern Sluch (Belarusian: Случ, Паўночная Случ;) is a river of Belarus. Rising in Minsk Voblast it flows past the cities of Salihorsk and Slutsk, finally emptying into the Pripyat.

See also
Sluch (Ukraine), or Southern Sluch

References

Rivers of Brest Region
Rivers of Gomel Region
Rivers of Minsk Region
Rivers of Belarus